Ismael Mario Zambada García (born 1 January 1948) is a Mexican drug lord, co-founder and current top leader of the Sinaloa Cartel, an international crime syndicate based in Sinaloa. Before he assumed leadership of the entire cartel, he allegedly served as the logistical coordinator for its Guzmán-Zambada organization, which has overseen the trafficking of cocaine and heroin into Chicago and other US cities by aircraft, narcosubs, container ships, go-fast boats, fishing vessels, buses, rail cars, tractor trailers, and automobiles. As of early 2023, he has never been arrested or incarcerated and is the single last remaining fugitive of the List of Mexico's 37 most-wanted drug lords (2009).

Career
Zambada has historically worked closely with the Juárez Cartel and the Carrillo Fuentes family, while maintaining independent ties to Colombian cocaine suppliers. 

In 1989, when Mexican drug lord Miguel Ángel Félix Gallardo was arrested, his organization split into two opposing factions: the Tijuana Cartel whose leadership was inherited by his nephews and heirs, the Arellano Félix brothers and the Sinaloa Cartel whose leadership fell to former lieutenants Héctor Luis Palma Salazar, Ismael Zambada García and Joaquín Guzmán Loera (El Chapo). The Sinaloa Cartel drug lords were active in the states of Sinaloa, Durango, Chihuahua, Sonora, Nuevo León, and Nayarit.

Since 1998, Zambada has been wanted by Mexico's attorney general's office, when it issued bounties totaling $2.8 million USD on him and five other leaders of the Juárez Cartel. 

In 2006, the administration of President Felipe Calderón launched an offensive against Mexico's drug trafficking networks. The Tijuana Cartel, the largest and most sophisticated of the Mexican cartels at the time, received the brunt of the blows. Taking advantage of the pressure being placed on the Tijuana Cartel, other drug bosses, most notably Ismael Zambada and Joaquín Guzmán, began to encroach on strongholds in northwestern Mexico, leading to full-scale war.

Zambada's organization, the Sinaloa Cartel, receives multi-ton quantities of cocaine, mostly by sea from Colombian sources. It uses a variety of methods, including airplanes, trucks, cars, boats, and tunnels to transport the cocaine to the United States. Members of the cartel smuggle the cocaine to distribution cells in Arizona, Atlanta, California, Illinois, and New York. Zambada has been operating primarily in the States of Sinaloa and Durango, with influence along a large portion of Mexico's Pacific coast, as well as in Cancun, Quintana Roo, Sonora, and Nuevo Leon.

In 2007, Zambada was featured on America's Most Wanted, and the FBI has been offering up to US$5 million for information leading to his capture.

In 2011, it was thought Zambada may have had plastic surgery and disguised himself to move throughout Mexico.
Until 2016, Zambada headed the Sinaloa Cartel in partnership with Joaquín "El Chapo" Guzmán, when El Chapo was captured. Since 2016, Zambada is thought to have assumed full command of the Sinaloa Cartel and to be Mexico's most enduring and powerful drug lord. 

In 2019 his son, Vicente Zambada Niebla, testified against Joaquin Guzman Loera and recounted the shipment of tons of drugs by his father, and "that his father’s bribery budget was often as much as $1 million per month, with bribes going to many high-level Mexican public officials".

On 24 June 2020, it was revealed that Zambada had been willing to give former top Mexican drug lords Rafael Caro Quintero and Miguel Caro Quintero high ranking positions in the Sinaloa Cartel if they agreed to join. However, the effort to recruit the brothers faltered as Zambada's health declined and El Chapo's sons, who were less willing to grant them leadership, gained more influence.

Personal life 
Zambada is married to Rosario Niebla Cardoza. He has four sons and four daughters. His wife and sons, Serafín Zambada-Ortiz (alias "el Sera", as of 2018 arrested and released), and Ismael Zambada-Imperial (alias "el Mayito gordo", convicted), as well as his four daughters, María Teresa, Midiam Patricia, Mónica del Rosario, and Modesta, have played an active role in narcotics' distribution and money laundering. On 18 March 2009, his son Vicente Zambada Niebla was arrested by the Mexican Army. His other son, Ismael "Mayito" Zambada Jr. has been sought for conspiracy to distribute a controlled substance in the United States. 

On 20 October 2010, some of his relatives were arrested in Mexico City on drug trafficking charges: Ismael's brother, Jesus "The King" Zambada, along with Ismael's son and nephew.

On 18 June 2014, his son-in-law, Juan Gabriel González Ibarra, husband of Midiam Patricia, died after suffering an electric shock at his home in Culiacán .

In June 2020, former DEA agent Mike Vigil revealed that Zambada was "sick with diabetes."

In popular culture
"Don Ismael", a character inspired by Zambada García, was featured in the 2017 television series El Chapo.

See also

 List of fugitives from justice who disappeared
 List of Mexico's 37 most-wanted drug lords
 Mérida Initiative
 Mexican Drug War
 War on Drugs

References

Bibliography

External links
 Most Wanted Fugitive: Ismael Zambada Garcia – Drug Enforcement Administration

1948 births
Fugitives wanted on organised crime charges
Living people
People from Culiacán Municipality

People sanctioned under the Foreign Narcotics Kingpin Designation Act
Sinaloa Cartel traffickers